Perry Firestone King (born April 30, 1948) is an American actor. He is best known for his roles on television and in films. 

King received a Golden Globe nomination for his role in the television film The Hasty Heart (1983), which is a remake of the 1949 film of the same title.

Life and career

Early life
King was born in Alliance, Ohio; his father was a physician. His maternal grandfather was Maxwell Perkins, a well-known editor for the publishing house Charles Scribner's Sons. Through Perkins, King is descended from U.S. Senator William M. Evarts and from Roger Sherman, one of the signers of the Declaration of independence.  King received a degree in drama from Yale University, and also studied at Juilliard.

Career
King made his film debut, aged around 23, in the 1972 film Slaughterhouse-Five. In 1975, he portrayed Hammond Maxwell in Mandingo.

Since the 1970s, he has appeared in dozens of feature films, television series and television movies. He auditioned for the role of Han Solo in Star Wars, but the role ultimately went to Harrison Ford. However, he played the character in the radio adaptations of Star Wars and both its sequels. 

In 1984, King was nominated for a Golden Globe award for his role in the TV movie The Hasty Heart. That same year, he landed the role of Cody Allen on the series Riptide.

In 1993, he starred in the television adaptation of Sidney Sheldon's novel A Stranger in the Mirror, which is a roman à clef on Groucho Marx. In 1995, he portrayed the role of Hayley Armstrong on Melrose Place. He also appeared as Richard Williams in the NBC TV series Titans with Yasmine Bleeth in 2000  and as the President of the United States in the 2004 film The Day After Tomorrow.

King has made guest appearances on TV shows including Spin City, Will & Grace, Eve, and Cold Case.

He has also worked as a voice actor, voice-acting for Samson in the 1985 animated feature Samson & Delilah and the character of Randall in an episode of SWAT Kats: The Radical Squadron.

Personal life
Married and divorced twice, King has two daughters and one granddaughter.

An avid motorcyclist, King was featured on Huell Howser's California's Gold where he spoke about his collection of motorcycles and sidecars. In December 2008, the American Motorcyclist Association (AMA) appointed King to its Board of Directors.

Filmography

Film

Television

Award nominations
Golden Apple Award
Nominated: Male New Star of the Year (1975)

Golden Globe Awards
Nominated: Best Performance by an Actor in a Supporting Role in a Series, Mini-Series or Motion Picture Made for TV, The Hasty Heart'' (1984)

References

External links

 
 
 

1948 births
Living people
American male stage actors
American male film actors
American male television actors
Juilliard School alumni
Yale University alumni
Male actors from Ohio
People from Alliance, Ohio
20th-century American male actors
21st-century American male actors